SAF3 (pronounced "Safe"), also known by its working title Rescue 3, is a syndicated American action-drama television series following the daily challenges of the S(Sea), A(Air), and F(Fire) divisions of the Malibu Fire Department. This series consists of 20 episodes that originally ran during the 2013–14 season.

Although this series originated in the United States and is set in California, it was filmed in South African locations such as Cape Town and Camps Bay Beach.

Cast

 Dolph Lundgren as Captain John Eriksson, team leader
 J. R. Martinez as Alfonso Rivera, paramedic firefighter 
 Texas Battle as Texas Daly, water rescuer
 Katie Meehan as Charley Frazer, rookie lifeguard
 Lydia Hull as Lily Maddox, firefighter 
 Jocelyn Osorio as Graciela Vega, field medic
 Danielle Anderson as Kacie West, John's daughter
 Karl Thaning as Jared Taylor, a pilot
 Pia Lamberg as Heather, a lifeguard
 Chris Fisher as Bryce Elliott, a lifeguard
 Travis Burns as Chase Robertson, a lifeguard

Recurring
 Kim Engelbrecht as Becca Conners
 Lex King as Lex

Episode list

References

External links
 
 
 SAF3.tv

2010s American drama television series
2013 American television series debuts
2014 American television series endings
American action television series
First-run syndicated television programs in the United States